Sanbon-dong is a dong, or neighborhood, in Gunpo, a satellite city of Seoul in Gyeonggi Province, South Korea. Due to its population of more than 50,000, for administrative purposes the area is divided into two dong, Sanbon 1-dong and Sanbon 2-dong. Its name can be translated as "the mountain's root," and refers to its position at the base of Surisan's eastern flank. On the other side of Surisan lies Anyang City.

The administrative entity of Sanbon  was formed in 1914, as part of a general nationwide consolidation of local government under the Japanese occupation.  At that time it was Sanbon-ri, a rural precinct  of Siheung County.  When it became part of the new Gunpo City in 1989, its status was changed from ri to dong.  The name is believed to derive from Sanjeo, "low on the mountain," which was first used to describe the region in 1789.

Seoul Subway Line 4 stops at Sanbon Station. Other landmarks include various Joseon Dynasty relics:  a large kiln site, a shrine of the royal Jeonju Yi clan, and the tomb of  17th-century scholar Hoam Yi Gi-jo.

There is an active garbage incineration plant(군포환경관리소) in Sanbon-dong.

References

Notes

See also
Geography of South Korea
Subdivisions of South Korea

External links 
 Korean-language site of Sanbon 1-dong government

Neighbourhoods in Gunpo